Parakysis anomalopteryx is a species of catfish of the family Akysidae. A detailed discussion of this species's relationship with the other five members of its genus can be found at Parakysis.

Akysidae
Freshwater fish of Indonesia
Fish described in 1989